William Ward McKalip (June 5, 1907 – July 11, 1993) is a former American football end and half back who played four seasons in the NFL with the Portsmouth Spartans/Detroit Lions.

College career
McKalip chose to enroll at Oregon State for his college education and to play football.  He lettered in football from 1926 through 1928. As a senior, he earned All-Pacific Coast Conference First-team, Associated Press All-Northwest First-team, and United Press International All-Coast Second-team.  He was also chosen to play in the 1930 East-West Shrine Game.

Professional career
McKalip played in the NFL for four seasons, two with the Portsmouth Spartans and two after they became the Detroit Lions.  During his time with the program, he was a two-time All-Pro selection in 1931 and 1934.  In the 1931 season, he had 4 receiving touchdowns.

Legacy
McKalip was named to the Oregon Sports Hall of Fame in 1991 and the Oregon State University Hall of Fame in 1990, both for his football prowess.  He died in Corvallis, Oregon on July 11, 1993.

References

1907 births
1993 deaths
Oregon State Beavers football players
Detroit Lions players
Portsmouth Spartans players